Institute of Astronomy or Institute for Astronomy may refer to:

 Institute of Astronomy, Cambridge, England
 Institute of Astronomy of the Bulgarian Academy of Sciences, Sofia, Bulgaria
 Institute of Astronomy, National Central University, Jhongli, Taiwan
 Institute of Astronomy, NCU, Toruń, Poland
 Institute of Astronomy of the Russian Academy of Sciences, Moscow, Russia
 Institute for Astronomy (Hawaii), Honolulu, Hawaii, United States
 Institute for Astronomy, School of Physics and Astronomy, University of Edinburgh, Scotland
 Institute for Astronomy, Astrophysics, Space Applications and Remote Sensing, Mount Penteli, Greece
 Institute for Astronomy and Astrophysics, Brussels, Belgium
 Academia Sinica Institute of Astronomy and Astrophysics, Taipei, Taiwan
 Dunlap Institute for Astronomy & Astrophysics, Toronto, Canada
 Max Planck Institute for Astronomy, Heidelberg, Baden-Württemberg, Germany

See also
 
 
 Argentine Institute of Radio Astronomy, Buenos Aires, Argentina
 ASTRON, the Netherlands Institute for Radio Astronomy
 Indian Institute of Astrophysics, Bengaluru, Karnataka, India
 Korea Astronomy and Space Science Institute, Daejeon, South Korea
 Max Planck Institute for Radio Astronomy (Max-Planck-Institut für Radioastronomie), in Bonn, Germany.